Kenny "Blues Boss" Wayne (born Kenneth Wayne Spruell, November 13, 1944) is an American blues, boogie-woogie and jazz pianist, singer and songwriter. Music journalist, Jeff Johnson, writing in the Chicago Sun-Times stated, "There's no boogie-woogie-blues piano man out there today who pounds the 88's with the conviction of Kenny "Blues Boss" Wayne."

Biography
Wayne was born in 1944 in Spokane, Washington, but he relocated with his family to San Francisco, California at an early age. His parents alternatively advised for and against the blues, but his mother's influence led Wayne to be influenced early by Nat King Cole, Little Willie John, and Fats Domino. The family moved in turn to New Orleans, Los Angeles and Compton, California. While he was growing up, Wayne drew further inspiration from The Three Sounds, George Shearing, Erroll Garner, Cal Tjader, Mongo Santamaría, Ray Charles, Charles Brown, Floyd Dixon, Big Joe Turner, and Jimmy Reed.

Based in Los Angeles during the 1960s and 1970s, Wayne was utilised as a sideman by various pop and rock musicians. In the 1980s Wayne relocated again to Vancouver, British Columbia.  "Blues Boss" (his nickname was acquired from the title of Amos Milburn's comeback album with Motown Records) undertook a tour of Europe in 1994. Wayne dedicated his debut album to his parents, and 2002 heralded the issue of 88th & Jump Street, followed by Blues Carry Me Home (2003) and Let It Loose (2005).

His festival appearances have included Edmonton's Labatt Blues Festival (2004), Koktebel Jazz Festival (2006) and Southside Shuffle in Port Credit, Ontario (2015).

In May 2008, Wayne issued his album, Can't Stop Now. Wayne's recent release, Rollin' with the Blues Boss (2014), included guest contributions from Diunna Greenleaf and Eric Bibb. Wayne's 2016 release, Jumpin' & Boppin''' featured guitarist Duke Robillard.

Juno Awards
Nominated in 1997 for 'Best Blues/Gospel Album,' and in 1999 and 2003 for 'Best Blues Album,' Wayne was presented with a Juno Award in 2006 for Let It Loose.

Discography
SoloAlive & Lose (1995) - Blue RootsBlues Boss Boogie (1998) - Real Blues88th & Jump Street (2002) - Electro-FiBlues Carry Me Home (2002) - IsabelLet It Loose (2005) - Electro FiCan't Stop Now (2008) - Electro-FiAn Old Rock on a Roll (2011) - Stony PlainRollin' with the Blues Boss (2014) - Stony PlainJumpin' & Boppin' (2016) - Stony PlainInspired By The Blues (2018) - Stony PlainGo, Just Do It! (2020) - Stony Plain

CompilationsElectro-Fi records presents Piano-Rama (2010) - Electro-FiBig City Back Country Blues (2017) - Brandon Isaak Music

Compilation inclusionsSaturday Night Blues: 20 Years'' (2006) - CBC

See also
List of boogie woogie musicians
List of people from Spokane, Washington

References

External links
Official website

1944 births
Living people
American blues pianists
American male pianists
American blues singers
American jazz pianists
American male singers
Songwriters from Washington (state)
Boogie-woogie pianists
Musicians from Spokane, Washington
Juno Award for Blues Album of the Year winners
Singers from Washington (state)
20th-century American pianists
21st-century American pianists
20th-century American male musicians
21st-century American male musicians
American male jazz musicians
Stony Plain Records artists
American male songwriters